Barbaresco is an Italian wine made with the Nebbiolo grape. Barbaresco is produced in the Piedmont region in an area of the Langhe immediately to the east of Alba and specifically in the comunes of Barbaresco, Treiso and Neive plus that area of the frazione San Rocco Seno d'Elvio which was once part of the comune of Barbaresco and now belongs to the comune of Alba. It was granted Denominazione di origine controllata (DOC) status in 1966 and Denominazione di Origine Controllata e Garantita status in 1980. The wine is often compared with Barolo—another Nebbiolo based wine from the Piedmont area. Though the wines do share many similarities, there are some distinct differences between them.

History
Although it was already well known for the quality of its Nebbiolo grapes, the widely accepted birthdate of Barbaresco is 1894, when Cantina Sociale di Barbaresco was founded, as before that date Nebbiolo grapes from the Barbaresco area were mostly sold to Barolo producers. Domizio Cavazza, a young and brilliant agronomist born in Modena, was named to be the founding director of Alba's Royal Enological School in 1881, and soon started to develop its passion for Barbaresco, which led to his purchase of a farm and a vineyard in 1886. He cultivated its vineyard with Nebbiolo and with a group of nine growers founded the Cantina Sociale, outfitted with barrels and winemaking equipment in order to produce what are considered the first wines to be officially called Barbaresco. After a good start Barbaresco fell on hard times with World War I and the premature death of Cavazza in 1915.

It was not until the late 1950s that Barbaresco would stir to life again thanks to a new generation of dynamic winemakers, including Bruno Giacosa and Angelo Gaja. In addition, the local parish priest, Don Fiorino Marengo, founded Produttori del Barbaresco cooperative cellar, the successor to Cavazza's original vision to make outstanding wine and stop the exodus of young farmers who were abandoning the countryside.

By the late 1960s, the Gaja and Bruno Giacosa wineries began to market Barbaresco internationally with some success. The Produttori cooperative became one of the most respected cellars in Italy and inspired more landholders in Barbaresco to return to their vineyards and to make quality wine.

Wine regions
The soils of Barbaresco zone are composed primarily of calcareous marl dating from the Tortonian epoch. The area is typically divided into three regions based on the principal towns of the area - Barbaresco, Neive and Treiso. The soil and climate of the three areas are very uniform, which creates more across-the-board consistency than is found among the 11 communities in the Barolo zone.

Barbaresco
The vineyards around the town of Barbaresco make up for 45% of Barbaresco production with many of the area's largest wineries located in town. Wines from this area tend to be relatively light in color and body, but very well structured and aromatic.

Neive
In Neive, the Nebbiolo grape is fourth in plantings behind the cultivation of Barbera, Dolcetto and Moscato but this region is known for making some of the most powerful and tannic expressions of Barbaresco. The area is also home to the highly esteemed Nebbiolo vineyards of Santo Stefano and Bricco di Neive whose names are starting to appear on some single-vineyard bottlings. Located east of Barbaresco, Neive is responsible for 31% of Barbaresco's production and makes some of the most full-bodied and tannic examples of the wine.

Treiso

Located south of Barbaresco, with vineyards on the highest hilltop sites in the area, Treiso wines tend to be the lightest in body and are principally known for their finesse. A smaller area, Treiso accounts for 20% of the Barbaresco zone's production.

Vineyard classifications
Beginning in the late 19th century, there have been attempts to classify the area's vineyards into Burgundian-like crus based on which areas produced the best wines. The Italian wine critic Luigi Veronelli created one such list in the 1960s and other writers and viticulturist attempted to create their own in the 1970s. Today many follow the lists compiled by the négociant based on which grapes are more highly priced based on performance. These lists typically include the Asili, Martinenga, Montefico, Montestefano and Rabajà vineyards in Barbaresco, the Albesani, Santo Stefano, Bricco di Neive and Gallina vineyards in Neive, and the Pajorè vineyard in Treiso.

In 2007 the Barbaresco Consorzio was the first to introduce the Menzioni Geografiche Aggiuntive (additional geographic mentions) also known as MEGA or subzones; there were 65 officially approved subzones, with one more approved in 2010 which brought the final number to 66. The main goal was to put official boundaries to some of the most storied crus in order to protect them from unjustified expansion and exploitation. Following the introductions of subzones the term Vigna (Italian for vineyard) can be used on labels after its respective MEGA and only if the vineyard lies within one of the approved MEGA.

Wines

DOCG regulations stipulate that Barbaresco wines must be aged for a minimum of 2 years (at least 9 months in wooden barrels) prior to release and aged for at least 4 years to be considered a riserva. The wines must have a minimum 12.5% alcohol level though most wines are closer to 13.5%. Well-made examples of Barbaresco wines are expected to be aged at least 5 to 10 years after vintage before they are consumed, as they are extremely tannic and tight in their youth, and some continue to drink well even after 20 years. The typical style of a Barbaresco has bouquets of roses or violets with flavor notes of cherry, truffles, fennel and licorice. As the wine ages, it can develop smoky notes and more earthy and animal flavors like leather and tar.

Differences from Barolo
Despite being made from the same grape and produced in neighboring areas, less than 10 miles from each other, the wines of Barbaresco and Barolo do have some distinct differences. Located south of the river Tanaro, the Barbaresco zone receives a slight maritime influence which allows Nebbiolo to ripen a little earlier than it does in the Barolo zone,  allowing earlier fermentation with a shorter maceration time. The early tannins in a young Barbaresco are not quite as harsh as Barolo and under DOCG rules it is allowed to age for a year less than Barolo. The Barolo wines that tend to be closer in body, fruitiness, and perfume to Barbaresco wines are generally the ones produced near the villages of La Morra and Barolo. The most pronounced difference between the two wines is that the tannins of Barbaresco tend to soften quicker, which can make the wines more approachable to drink at an earlier age but won't allow it to age for as long as a traditionally made Barolo could. The smaller vineyard areas mean that annual production of Barbaresco is around 35% the production of Barolo and therefore the wines are not as widely available out on the market. However, the smaller area does generally produce more consistent profiles among the Barbarescos than across the more expansive Barolo zone.

See also

References

    regione.piemonte.it

Footnotes

Italian DOCG
Wines of Piedmont
Province of Cuneo
Vineyard Landscape of Piedmont: Langhe-Roero and Monferrato